The Stenbock family is an old Swedish noble family, of which one younger branch established itself in Finland and another younger branch in Estonia, both of them in the mid 18th century, of which the first was entered into the rolls of the Finnish House of Nobility and the latter received both Estonian and Russian letters of nobility.

Notable members
Ebba Stenbock (15??–1614)
Catherine Stenbock (1535–1621)
Gustaf Otto Stenbock (1614–1685)
Magdalena Stenbock (1649–1727)
Hedvig Eleonora Stenbock (1658–1714)
Magnus Stenbock (1664–1717)
Eric Stenbock (1858–1895)

Gallery

See also 
 Stenbock House, seat of the government of Estonia in Tallinn

External links 
 
 Ivan Stenbock-Fermor, Memoirs of life in old Russia, World War I, revolution, and in emigration : oral history transcript

Swedish noble families
Baltic nobility
Baltic-German people
Swedish-language surnames